The Pakistan Sikh Council (PSC) (Gurmukhi: ਪਾਕਿਸਤਾਨ ਸਿੱਖ ਕੌਂਸਲ;) is a Sikh organisation in Pakistan which works for rights of Sikh community in Pakistan. In organisation Sardar Ramesh Singh Khalsa is Patron-in-Chief, Sardar Tara Singh is president, Arshad Jee Singh is vice president and Karan Singh Rai is General Secretary. It is based in Karachi.

See also
Sardar Ramesh Singh
Sikhism in Pakistan
Pakistan Sikh Gurdwara Prabandhak Committee

References

External links
Pakistan Sikh Council

Religious organisations based in Pakistan
Sikhism in Pakistan
Sikh organisations